Michael Robert Alexander Brown (born 19 April 1966 in Glasgow) is a Scottish businessman convicted of perjury. Between 10 February and 30 March 2005 he donated £2.4 million to the Liberal Democrats. He was the largest donor the party had ever had, giving ten times more than anything it had received before.

Biography
Born in Glasgow, Scotland, Michael Brown claimed to have been the son of a lord and to have attended Gordonstoun and St Andrews University. In fact, he had failed his maths O Grade at his local school, and did a City and Guilds in catering at Glasgow College of Food Technology.

Brown resided in Majorca, Spain and claimed to have been an international bond trader, whose clients were vetted by United States embassy officials and Special Branch before he accepted their money. Brown's clients included former Manchester United chairman Martin Edwards.

In June 2008, after being charged with various counts of fraud and money laundering, Brown fled bail and an arrest warrant was subsequently issued. The charges of fraud and money laundering were later discharged by the judge at trial.

Brown was last known to live in Templewood Avenue, Hampstead, northwest London. He told various former clients he had been suffering from cancer, then took the surname Campbell-Brown and stopped shaving, before he disappeared. Neighbours of his Hampstead flat said that in the weeks before he disappeared he had changed his appearance by growing a full beard instead of his usual goatee and allowed his usually blond-dyed hair to turn grey. His lawyer disputed claims that Brown changed his appearance to abscond.

The City of London police conducted an extensive search both in the UK and abroad, including the home of Paul Strasburger, the fellow Lib Dem donor who put up bail for Brown prior to his disappearance.

Brown is believed to have reappeared in the Caribbean in late 2008. Credit cards connected to Brown were used there in September and October 2008 in Antigua and Barbuda, according to reports by a team of private detectives working for two of Brown's creditors. Records seen by The Observer newspaper showed that a credit card in the name of M. Campbell-Brown — a name used by Brown in the weeks before he disappeared — was used in Antigua and Barbuda at two cash dispensers during this period.

In a brazen move, Brown directed his solicitor, Jamil Ahmud, to issue a statement on his behalf that he had not used any credit cards in the past three years in the Caribbean.

In September 2011, it was reported by The Guardian that Brown was living in the Dominican Republic under a false identity. On 6 January 2012, he was arrested by the Dominican police.

Trial 
In August 2008 Southwark Crown Court Judge Wadsworth decided that the trial could proceed in the defendant's absence and as private funding had run out to his legal team, Brown would be eligible for legal aid.

In November 2008, a trial was held in the Crown Court in absentia. The jury was told Brown carefully crafted an "illusion of wealth and influence" designed to give him social acceptability which he craved, which included pretending his father was a lord, claimed connections with royalty, and promised investors returns of up to 50%. Martin Edmunds, QC, prosecuting, said he used the money to fund an "extravagant lifestyle", pay business expenses and keep other investors happy with "pretend" returns.

Brown rented a £49,000-a-year Mayfair apartment where he "conducted negotiations" with Edwards, an impressive office in the same area, a Range Rover with the number plate 5 AVE.  Brown also spent £2.5m on a private jet, £400,000 on an ocean-going yacht and £327,000 on an entertainment system for his home in Majorca.

On 28 November 2008, the jury took nine-and-a-half hours to convict him on four counts – two thefts, one of furnishing false information and one of perverting the course of justice between 9 February 2005 and 17 April 2006. He was convicted in his absence and sentenced to seven years in prison.

Electoral Commission on donation to Liberal Democrat party
Because he was residing in Majorca, Spain, at the time of the donation, and was not registered to vote in the United Kingdom, Michael Brown used a company name as the official legal donor. In October 2006 the High Court in London ruled that the company which Brown used to donate the money to the Liberal Democrats, 5th Avenue Partners, had never traded in bonds.
The Electoral Commission issued a statement stating:

Robert Mann, a Los Angeles lawyer, has issued a High Court writ demanding £683,000 from the Lib Dems claiming that they allowed their desire for the windfall to overcome any doubts about its source.

On 20 November 2009, the Electoral Commission issued a press release, stating that:

A full case summary was also made available on the Commission's website.

In April 2010, the fugitive fraudster, Michael Brown, was one of the subjects of Britain's first televised election debate.

References

1966 births
Living people
Criminals from Glasgow
Scottish fraudsters
Place of birth missing (living people)
Liberal Democrats (UK) people
2008 crimes in the United Kingdom
2008 in London
British people convicted of theft
British people convicted of perverting the course of justice
People convicted of fraud